The 2018 Barnsley Metropolitan Borough Council election took place on 3 May 2018 to elect members of Barnsley Metropolitan Borough Council in England. This was on the same day as other local elections.

Result

Candidates

Central ward

Cudworth ward

Darfield ward

Darton East ward

Darton West ward

Dearne North ward

Dearne South ward

Dodworth ward

Hoyland Milton ward

Kingstone ward

Monk Bretton ward

North East ward

Old Town ward

Penistone East ward

Penistone West ward

Rockingham ward

Royston ward

St Helen's ward

Stairfoot ward

Wombwell ward

Worsbrough ward

By-elections between 2018 and 2019

References

2018 English local elections
2018
2010s in South Yorkshire